Fourth Avenue may refer to:

 Fourth Avenue (Manhattan) or Park Avenue
 Fourth Avenue (Brooklyn)
 Fourth Avenue (Pittsburgh)

See also
 Fourth Avenue Building (disambiguation)
 Fourth Avenue Historic District (disambiguation)
 Fourth Avenue Line (disambiguation)